Macadam Flower is the third album from French soprano Emma Shapplin. It is more pop-oriented than her previous work and is mainly performed in English.

Track listing

Charts

Release history

Macadam Flower Tour
The Macadam Flower Tour was recorded and released as The Macadam Flower Tour – live concert in Athens DVD.

References

External links
Official site

Emma Shapplin albums
2009 albums
French-language albums
Italian-language albums